When a Feller Needs a Friend is a 1932 American pre-Code drama film directed by Harry A. Pollard and written by Frank Butler and Sylvia Thalberg. The film stars Jackie Cooper, Charles "Chic" Sale, Ralph Graves, Dorothy Peterson, Andy Shuford, and Helen Parrish. The film was released on April 30, 1932, by Metro-Goldwyn-Mayer.

Plot
Eddie (Cooper) wears a leg brace and his mother will not let him play like the other boys. His hope is that a German doctor will be able to operate and fix his leg. When his cousin Froggie comes to live with his family, he is nice to Mr. and Mrs. Randall, but mean to Eddie.

Uncle Jonas (Sale) sees what is happening, but Eddie's parents do not believe him as Froggie seems so nice. Uncle Jonas tries to make Eddie tougher by teaching him boxing and baseball, but all it does is get Jonas thrown out of the house.

Cast 
Jackie Cooper as Edward Haverford 'Eddie' Randall
Charles "Chic" Sale as Uncle Jonas Tucker
Ralph Graves as Mr. Tom Randall
Dorothy Peterson as Mrs. Margaret Randall
Andy Shuford as Frederick 'Froggie'
Helen Parrish as Diana Manning
Donald Haines as Fatty Bullen
Gus Leonard as Abraham
Oscar Apfel as Doctor

References

External links 
 

1932 films
American drama films
1932 drama films
Metro-Goldwyn-Mayer films
Films directed by Harry A. Pollard
American black-and-white films
1930s English-language films
1930s American films